Zahun Bareh (also Romanized as Zahūn Bareh) is a village in Somam Rural District, Rankuh District, Amlash County, Gilan Province, Iran. At the 2006 census, its population was 28, in 7 families.

References 

Populated places in Amlash County